Parrot is an unincorporated community in Jackson County, Kentucky, United States. Parrot had a post office which opened on September 7, 1898, and closed on July 23, 1994. The community was named for a local family; it has also been called Letter Box, as before the post office opened residents used a letter box attached to a tree for mail service.

References

Unincorporated communities in Jackson County, Kentucky
Unincorporated communities in Kentucky